This is a list of township-level divisions of the province of Hubei, People's Republic of China (PRC). After province, prefecture, and county-level divisions, township-level divisions constitute the formal fourth-level administrative divisions of the PRC. As of late 2016, there were over 1,000 such divisions in Hubei, including 307 subdistricts, 759 towns, and 168 townships. After changes, as of late 2017, there were 308 subdistricts, 761 towns, and 165 townships . This list is divided first into the prefecture-level then the county-level divisions.

Wuhan

Caidian District
Subdistricts:

Caidian Subdistrict, Zhashan Subdistrict, Yong'an Subdistrict, Zhuru Subdistrict, Daji Subdistrict, Zhangwan Subdistrict, Zhuankou Avenue Subdistrict, Junshan Subdistrict

Towns:
Suohe, Yuxian

The only township is Xiaosi Township

Dongxihu District
Subdistricts:
Wujiashan Subdistrict, Baiquan/Boquan Subdistrict, Jiangjun Road Subdistrict, Cihui Subdistrict, Zoumaling Subdistrict, Jinghe Subdistrict, Changqing Subdistrict, Xin'andu Subdistrict, Dongshan Subdistrict, Changqinghuayuan New Area Subdistrict, Xingouzhen Subdistrict, Jinyinhu Subdistrict

Hannan District
Subdistricts:
Shamao Subdistrict, Dengnan Subdistrict, Dongjing Subdistrict, Xiangkou Subdistrict

Hanyang District
Subdistricts:
Jianqiao Subdistrict, Longyang Subdistrict, Sixin Subdistrict, Qingchuan Subdistrict, Yingwu Subdistrict, Zhoutou Subdistrict, Wulidun Subdistrict, Qinduankou Subdistrict, Jianghan'erqiao Subdistrict, Yongfeng Subdistrict, Jiangdi Subdistrict
Areas:
Hanyang Economic Development Zone 汉阳经济开发区, Sixin Area 四新地区

Hongshan District
Nine subdistricts:
Luonan Subdistrict, Guanshan Subdistrict, Shizishan Subdistrict, Zhangjiawan Subdistrict, Liyuan Subdistrict, Zhuodaoquan Subdistrict, Hongshan Subdistrict, Heping Subdistrict, Qingling Subdistrict

The only township is Tianxing Township

Two other areas:
Qingtanhu, Donghu Scenic Area Subdistrict

Huangpi District
Subdistricts:

Qianchuan Subdistrict, Qijiawan Subdistrict, Hengdian Subdistrict, Luohansi Subdistrict, Shekou Subdistrict, Liuzhidian Subdistrict, Tianhe Subdistrict, Wangjiahe Subdistrict, Changxuanling Subdistrict, Liji Subdistrict, Yaoji Subdistrict, Caizha Subdistrict, Wuhu Subdistrict

The only town is Sanli

Townships:
Caidian Township, Mulan Township

Jiang'an District
Subdistricts:
Dazhi Subdistrict, Yiyuan Subdistrict, Chezhan Subdistrict, Siwei Subdistrict, Yongqing Subdistrict, Xima Subdistrict, Qiuchang Subdistrict, Laodong Subdistrict, Erqi Subdistrict, Xincun Subdistrict, Danshuichi Subdistrict, Taibei Subdistrict, Huaqiao Subdistrict, Shenjiaji Subdistrict

Other Areas:

Houhu Office, Tazihu Office

Jianghan District
Thirteen subdistricts:
Minzu Subdistrict, Hualou Subdistrict, Shuita Subdistrict, Minquan Subdistrict, Manchun Subdistrict, Minyi Subdistrict, Xinhua Subdistrict, Wansong Subdistrict, Tangjiadun Subdistrict, Beihu Subdistrict, Qianjin Subdistrict, Changqing Subdistrict, Hanxing Subdistrict

Jiangxia District
Subdistricts:
Zhifang Subdistrict, Jinkou Subdistrict, Wulongquan Subdistrict, Zhengdian Subdistrict, Liufang Subdistrict, Wulijie Subdistrict, Jinshui Subdistrict, Anshan Subdistrict, Shanpo Subdistrict, Fozuling Subdistrict, Baoxie Subdistrict, Binhu Subdistrict

Towns:
Fasi, Husi

The only township is Shu'an Township

Qiaokou District
Eleven subdistricts:
Gutian Subdistrict, Hanjiadun Subdistrict, Zongguan Subdistrict, Hanshuiqiao Subdistrict, Baofeng Subdistrict, Ronghua Subdistrict, Hanzhong Subdistrict, Hanzheng Subdistrict, Liujiaoting Subdistrict, Changfeng Subdistrict, Yijia Subdistrict

Qingshan District
Subdistricts:
Hongwei Road Subdistrict, Yejin Subdistrict, Xingouqiao Subdistrict, Honggangcheng Subdistrict, Gongrencun Subdistrict, Qingshanzhen Subdistrict, Changqian Subdistrict, Wudong Subdistrict, Baiyushan Subdistrict, Ganghuacun Subdistrict, Gangduhuayuan Subdistrict

Other: Beihu Administrative Committee Subdistrict

Wuchang District
Fifteen subdistricts:
Jiyuqiao Subdistrict, Yangyuan Subdistrict, Xujiapeng Subdistrict, Liangdao Subdistrict, Zhonghualu Subdistrict, Huanghelou Subdistrict, Ziyang Subdistrict, Baishazhou Subdistrict, Shouyilu Subdistrict, Zhongnanlu Subdistrict, Shuiguohu Subdistrict, Luojiashan Subdistrict, Shidong Subdistrict, Nanhu Subdistrict, Donghu Scenic Area Subdistrict

Xinzhou District
Subdistricts:
Zhucheng Subdistrict, Yangluo Subdistrict, Cangbu Subdistrict, Wangji Subdistrict, Liji Subdistrict, Sandian Subdistrict, Pantang Subdistrict, Jiujie Subdistrict, Shuangliu Subdistrict, Zhangduhu Subdistrict

Towns:
Xinchong, Xugu, Fenghuang

Enshi Tujia and Miao Autonomous Prefecture

Enshi City
Three subdistricts:
Wuyangba Subdistrict, Liujiaoting Subdistrict, Xiaoduchuan Subdistrict

Five towns:
Longfeng, Cuiba, Banqiao, Baiyangping, Sancha

Eight townships:
Xintang Township, Hongtu Township, Shadi Township, Taiyanghe Township, Tunbao Township, Baiguo Township, Bajiao Dong Ethnic Township, Shengjiaba Township

Other area:
Mufu

Lichuan
Two subdistricts:
Duting Subdistrict, Dongcheng Subdistrict

Seven towns:
Moudao, Baiyangba, Wangying, Jiannan, Zhonglu, Tuanbao, Maoba

Five townships:
Liangwu Township, Yuanbao Township, Nanping Township, Wendou Township, Shaxi Township

Badong County
Ten towns:
Badong, Dongrang/nangkou, Yanduhe, Guandukou, Chadianzi, Lücongpo, Dazhiping, Yesanguan, Shuibuya, Qingtaiping

Two townships:
Xiqiuwan Township, Jinguoping Township

Hefeng County
Five towns:
Zouma, Rongmei, Taiping, Yanzi, Zhongying

Four townships:
Tielu Township, Wuli Township, Xiaping Township, Wuyang Township

Jianshi County
Seven towns:
Yezhou, Gaoping, Hongyansi, Jingyang, Guandian, Huaping, Changliang

Three townships:
Maotian Township, Longping Township, Sanli Township

Laifeng County
Six towns:
Xiangfeng, Baifusi, Dahe, Lüshui, Jiusi, Geleche

Two townships:
Manshui Township, Sanhu Township

Xianfeng County
Six towns:
Gaoleshan, Zhongbao, Pingbaying, Chaoyangsi, Qingping, Tangya

Four townships:
Dingzhai Township, Huolongping Township, Xiaocun Township, Huangjindong Township

One other area:
Daluba Zone

Xuan'en County
Five towns:
Zhushan, Jiaoyuan, Shadaogou, Lijiahe Gaoluo

Four townships:
Wanzhai Township, Changtanhe Dong Ethnic Township, Xiaoguan Dong Ethnic Township, Chunmuying Township

Ezhou

Echeng District
Three subdistricts:
Fenghuang Subdistrict, Gulou Subdistrict, Xishan Subdistrict

Nine towns:
Zelin, Dushan, Xinmiao, Bishidu, Tingzu, Yanji, Yangye, Huahu, Changgang

The only township is Shawo Township

Other areas:
Ezhou Economic Development Zone

Huarong District
Three towns:
Huarong, Miaoling, Duandian

Two townships:
Linjiang, Putuan

Liangzihu District
Five towns:
Taihe, Donggou, Liangzi Wildlife Management Area, Tujianao, Zhaoshan

Huanggang

Huangzhou District
Four subdistricts:
Chibi Subdistrict, Donghu Subdistrict, Yuwang Subdistrict, Nanhu Subdistrict

Three towns:
Lukou, Ducheng, Chencelou

The only township is Taodian Township.

One other area:
Railway Station Economic Development Area

Macheng
Subdistricts:
Longchiqoao Subdistrict, Gulou Subdistrict, Nanhu Subdistrict

Towns:
Zhongguanyi, Songbu, Qiting, Baiguo, Fuzihe, Yanjiahe, Guishan, Yantianhe, Zhangjiafan, Muzidian, Sanhekou, Huangtugang, Futianhe, C/Shengmagang, Shunhe

The only township is Tiemengang.

One other area: Macheng Economic Development Zone

Wuxue
Four subdistricts:
Wuxue Subdistrict, Kanjiang Subdistrict, Tianjiazhen Subdistrict (Tianzhen), Wanzhanghu Subdistrict

Eight towns:
Meichuan, Yuchuan, Huaqiao, Dajin, Shifosi, Siwang, Dafasi, Longping

Hong'an County
Towns:
Chengguan, Qiliping, Huajiahe, Ercheng, Shangxinji, Gaoqiao, Mi'ersi, Baliwan, Taipingqiao, Yongjiahe

The only township is Xinghua Township

Other Areas:
Huolianfan Tea Farm, Tiantaishan Scenic Area

Huangmei County
Twelve towns:
Huangmei, Konglong, Xiaochi, Xiaxin, Dahe, Tingqian, Wuzu, Zhuogang, Caishan, Xinkai, Dushan, Fenlu

Four townships:
Liulin Township, Shamu Township, Kuzhu Township, Liuzuo Township

Luotian County
Ten towns:
Fengshan, Luotuo'ao, Dahe'an, Jiuzihe, Shengli, Hepu, Sanlifan, Kuanghe (formerly a township 乡), Baimiaohe (formerly a township 乡), Daqi (formerly a township 乡)

Two townships:
Bailianhe Township, Pinghu Township

Qichun County
Thirteen towns:
Caohe, Chidong, Qizhou, Guanyao, Pengsi, Hengche, Zhulin, Liuhe, Shizi, Qingshi, Zhangbang, Datong, Tanlin

The only township is Xiangqiao Township

One other area: Balihu

Tuanfeng County
Eight towns:
Tuanfeng, Linshanhe, Fanggaoping, Huilongshan, Macaomiao, Shangbahe, Zongluzui, Dandian

Two townships:
Gu/Jiamiao Township, Dupi Township

Xishui County
Twelve towns:
Qingquan, Bahe, Zhuwa, Wanggang, Tuanpi, Guankou, Bailian, Caihe, Xianma, Dingsidang, Sanhua, Lanxi

The only township is Lüyang Township

Three other areas: Sanjiaoshan Forestry Area, Cehu Breeding Farm, Xishui Economic Development Zone

Yingshan County
Eight towns:

Wenquan, Nanhe, Hongshan, Jinjiapu, Shitouju, Caopandi, Leijiadian, Yangliuwan

Three townships:
Fangjiaju Township, Kongjiafang Township, Taojiahe Township

Four other areas:
Taohuachong Forestry Area, Wujiashan Forestry Area, Wufengshan Forestry Area, Yingshan County Economic Development District

Huangshi

Huangshigang District
Subdistricts:
Shenjiaying Subdistrict, Huangshigang Subdistrict, Hongqiqiao Subdistrict, Shengyanggang Subdistrict, Huahu Subdistrict

Tieshan District
The only administrative direct subdivision is a town-simulating village.

Xialu District
The only subdistrict is Tuanchengshan Subdistrict

Xisaishan District
Former Subdistricts:
Linjiang Subdistrict, Baquan Subdistrict, Chenjiawan Subdistrict, Chengyue Subdistrict, Huangsiwan Subdistrict, Xisaishan Subdistrict

The only town is Hekou

Daye
Subdistricts:
Dongyue Road Subdistrict, 东风路街道, Jinhu Subdistrict, Luojiaqiao Subdistrict, Jinshan Subdistrict

Towns:
 Jinniu, Bao'an, Lingxiang, Jinshandian, Haidiqiao, Yinzu, Liurenba, Chengui, Dajipu, Wangren

The only township is Mingshan Township

Other areas: 东风农场管理区, 四顾闸管理处

Yangxin County
Township-level divisions:
Xingguo, Fuchi, Huangsangkou, Weiyuankou (), Taizi, Dawang, Taogang, Baisha, Futu, Sanxi, Yanggang, Paishi, Mugang, Fenglin, Wangying

Jingmen

Dongbao District
Two subdistricts:
Longquan Subdistrict, Quankou Subdistrict

Six towns:
Lixi, Ziling, Zhanghe, Mahe, Shiqiaoyi, Pailou

The only township is Xianju Township

Duodao District
Four subdistricts:
Duodao Subdistrict, Baimiao Subdistrict, Xinglong Subdistrict, Shuangxi Subdistrict

Two towns:
Tuanlinpu, Macheng

Zhongxiang
The only subdistrict is Yingzhong Subdistrict

Towns:
Yangzi, Changshou, Fengle, Huji, Shuanghe, Linkuang, Wenji, Lengshui, Shipai, Jiukou, Chaihu, Changtan, Dongqiao, Kedian, Zhangji

The only township is Jiuli Township

Jingshan County
Towns:
Xinshi, Yongxing, Caowu, Luodian, Songhe, Pingba, Sanyang, Lülin, Yangji, Sunqiao, Shilong, Yonglong, Yanmenkou, Qianchang

Shayang County

Towns:
Shayang Town, Wulipu, Shilipu, Jishan, Shihuiqiao, Hougang, Maoli, Guandang, Lishi, Maliang, Gaoyang, Shenji, Zengji

Other Areas:
Binjiang New Area, Xingang Qu, Shayang Economic Development District, Shayang Prison Management

Jingzhou

Jingzhou District
Three subdistricts:
Xicheng Subdistrict, Dongcheng Subdistrict, Chengnan Subdistrict

Seven towns:
Jinan, Chuandian, Mashan, Balingshan, Libu, Mishi, Yingcheng

Two other areas:
Taihugang, Lingjiaohu

Shashi District
Five subdistricts:
Zhongshan Subdistrict (/), Chongwen Subdistrict (/), Jiefang Subdistrict (/), Shengli Subdistrict (/), Chaoyang Subdistrict (/) (formerly: Lianhe Subdistrict)

Four towns:
Luochang, Cenhe, Guanyindang, Guanju

The only township is Lixin Township

Honghu
Two subdistricts:
Xindi Subdistrict, Binhu Subdistrict

Fourteen towns:
Luoshan, Wulin, Longkou, Yanwo, Xintan, Fengkou, Caoshi, Fuchang, Daijiachang, Qujiawan, Shakou, Wanquan, Chahe, Huangjiakou

The only township is Laowan Township

Three administrative zones:
Xiaogang, Datonghu, Dashahu

Shishou
Two subdistricts:
Xiulin Subdistrict, Biheshan Subdistrict

Eleven towns:
Xinchang, Henggoushi, Dayuan, Xiaohekou, Taohuashan, Tiaoguan, Dongsheng, Gaojimiao, Nankou, Gaoling, Tuanshansi

The only township is Jiuheyuan Township

The only economic and technological development zone is Tian'ezhou

Songzi
Towns:
Xinjiangkou, Nanhai, Babao, Yuanshi, Laocheng, Chendian, Wangjiaqiao, Sijiachang, Yanglinshi, Zhichanghe, Jieheshi, Weishui, Liujiachang, Shadaoguan

Townships:
Wanjia Township, Xiejiaping Tujia Ethnic Township

Gong'an County
Fourteen towns:
Buhe, Douhudi, Jiazhuyuan, Zhakou, Yangjiachang, Mahaokou, Ouchi, Huangshantou, Mengjiaxi, Nanping, Zhangzhuangpu, Shizikou, Banzhudang, Maojiagang

Two townships:
Ganjiachang Township, Zhangtiansi Township

Jiangling County
Six towns:
Zishi, Xionghe, Baimasi, Shagang, Puji, Haoxue

Two townships:
Majiazhai Township, Qinshi Township

Three other areas:
Jiangbei, Sanhu, Lu/Liuheyuan

Jianli County
Eighteen towns:
Rongcheng, Zhuhe, Xingou, Gongchang, Zhoulaozui, Huangxiekou, Wangqiao, Chengji, Fenyan, Maoshi, Futiansi, Shangchewan, Bianhe, Chiba, Bailuo, Wangshi, Sanzhou, Qiaoshi

Three townships:
Hongcheng Township, Qipan Township, Zhemu Township

Two other areas:
Dayuan, Huanghu

Qianjiang

Six subdistricts:
Yuanlin Subdistrict, Yangshi Subdistrict, Zhouji Subdistrict, Guanghua Subdistrict, Taifeng Subdistrict, Gaochang Subdistrict

Ten towns:
Zhugentan, Yuyang, Wangchang, Gaoshibei, Xiongkou, Laoxin, Haokou, Jiyukou, Zhangjin, Longwan

Other areas:
Qianjiang Development Zone/Zekou Subdistrict, Bailuhu Administrative Area, Zongkou Administrative Area, Xiongkou Farm Administrative Area, Yunlianghu Administrative Area,  Houhu Administrative Area, Zhouji Administrative Area, Jianghan Oil Administrative Area

Shennongjia

Six towns:
Songbai, Yangri, Muyu, Hongping, Xinhua, Jiuhu

Two townships:
Songluo Township, Xiaguping Tujia Ethnic Township

Shiyan

Maojian District
Subdistricts:
Wudang Road Subdistrict, Eryan Subdistrict, Wuyan Subdistrict, Bailang Subdistrict

The only town is Dachuan

Townships:
Xiaochuan Township, Maota Township, Yuanyang Township

Zhangwan District
Four subdistricts:
Huaguo Subdistrict, Hongwei Subdistrict, Checheng Road Subdistrict, Hanjiang Road Subdistrict

Two towns:
Huanglong, Bailin

Two townships:
Fangtan Township, Xigou Township

Four other areas:
 Xicheng Economic Development Area, Shiyan Industrial New Area, Qinjiaping Forestry Area (Fenghuangshan Tea Farm

Danjiangkou
Subdistricts:
Junzhou Road Subdistrict, Daba Road/Daba Subdistrict (/), Danzhao Road Subdistrict, Sanguandian Subdistrict

Towns:
Tuguanya, Langhe, Dingjiaying, Liuliping, Yanchihe, Junxian, Xijiadian, Haoping, Shigu, Liangshuihe, Guanshan, Longshan

Other areas:
 Wudangshan Tourism Economic Special Area, Xingang Economic Development Management Area, Niuhe Forestry Development Management Area, Baiyangping Forestry Development Management Area, Dagou Forestry Development Management Area

Fang County
Towns:
Chengguan, Jundian, Hualongyan, Tucheng, Damuchang, Qingfeng, Mengusi, Baihe, Yerengu, Hongta, Yaohuai, Yinjifu

Townships:
Yaoping Township, Shahe Township, Wanyuhe Township, Shangkan Township, Zhongba Township, Jiudao Township, Huilong Township, Wutai Township

Yunyang District
Towns:
Chengguan, Anyang, Yangxipu, Qingqu, Baisangguan, Nanhuatang, Bailang, Liudong, Tanshan, Meipu, Qingshan, Chadian (Economic Development Zone), Liubei, Baoxia, Hujiaying, Tanjiawan

Townships:
Daliu Township, Wufeng Township, Yeda Township

Other area:
Hongyanbei Forestry Area

Yunxi County
Nine towns:
Chengguan, Tumen, Shangjin, Dianzi, Jiahe, Yangyi, Guanyin, Ma'an (formerly ), Hejia

Seven townships:
Xiangkou Township, Guanfang Township, Hubeikou Hui Ethnic Township, Jingyang Township, Liulang Township, Jianchi Township, Anjia Township

Two other areas:
 Huaishulin, Sanguandong Protected Natural Forest Area

Zhushan County
Nine towns:
Chengguan, Yishui, Majiadu, Baofeng, Leigu, Qingu, Desheng, Shangyong, Guandu

Eight townships:
Pankou Township, Zhuping Township, Damiao Township, Shuangtai Township, Loutai Township, Wenfeng Township, Shenhe Township, Liulin Township

Zhuxi County
Eleven towns:
Chengguan, Jiangjiayan, Zhongfeng, Shuiping, Xianhe, Quanxi, Fengxi, Longba, Bingying, Huiwan, Xinzhou

Four townships:
Eping Township, Tianbao Township, Taoyuan Township, Xiangba Township

Other areas:
Longwangya Tea Farm, Zhuxi County Comprehensive Farm, Stock Seed Farm, Fish Stock Farm, Wangjiashan Tea Farm, Biaohu Forestry Area , Shuangzhu Forestry Area, Baguashan Forestry Area, Yuanmao Forestry Area, Daiwanggou Forestry Area, Wangfuzuo Forestry Area, Tianchiya Forestry Area, Jiuligang Forestry Area, Shibali Canyon Management Bureau

Suizhou

Zengdu District
Four subdistricts:
Xicheng Subdistrict, Dongcheng Subdistrict, Nanjiao Subdistrict, Beijiao Subdistrict

Five towns:
Wandian, Hedian, Luoyang, Fuhe, Xihe

Other areas:
Chengnan New Area, Zengdu District New Industry Base, Suizhou City Economic Development Zone, Suizhou Tiedong New Area, Zengdu District Economic Development Zone

Guangshui
Four subdistricts:
Yingshan Subdistrict, Shili Subdistrict, Guangshui Subdistrict, Chengjiao Subdistrict

Thirteen towns:
Wushengguan, Yangzhai, Chenxiang, Changling, Maping, Guanmiao, Yudian, Wudian, Haodian, Caihe, Lidian, Taiping, Luodian

Other areas:
Zhonghuashan Forestry Area, Santan Scenic Area, Province-level Economic Development Area

Sui County
Nineteen towns:
Lishan, Gaocheng, Yindian, Caodian, Xiaolin, Huaihe, Wanhe, Shangshi, Tangxian, Wushan, Xinjie, Anju, Huantan (sometimes written as 环潭镇), Hongshan, Changgang, Sanligang, Liulin, Junchuan, Wanfudian (formerly Wanfu)

Tianmen

Subdistricts:
Jingling Subdistrict, Qiaoxiang Subdistrict Development Zone, Yanglin Subdistrict

Towns:
Duobao, Tuoshi, Zhanggang, Jiangchang, Wangchang, Yuxin, Huangtan, Yuekou, Henglin, Pengshi, Mayang, Duoxiang, Ganyi, Mawan, Lushi, Xiaoban, Jiuzhen, Zaoshi, Hushi, Shijiahe, Fozishan

The only township is Jingtan Township

Other Areas:
Tianmen Industrial Park, Jianghu Farm, Baimaohu Farm, Chenhu Committee

Xiangyang

Fancheng District
Subdistricts:
Hanjiang Subdistrict, Wangzhai Subdistrict, Zhongyuan Subdistrict, Dingzhongmen Subdistrict, Qinghekou Subdistrict, Pingxiangmen Subdistrict, Migong Subdistrict, Shipu Subdistrict, Zizhen Subdistrict, Qilihe Subdistrict, Dongfeng Subdistrict

Towns:
Niushou, Taipingdian, Tuanshan, Mizhuang

Xiangcheng District
Six subdistricts:
Zhenwushan Subdistrict, Gucheng Subdistrict, Panggong Subdistrict, Tanxi Subdistrict, Longzhong Subdistrict, Yujiahu Subdistrict

Two towns:
Oumiao, Wolong

The only township is Yinji Township

Xiangzhou District
Subdistricts:
Zhangwan Subdistrict, Liuji Subdistrict, Xiaowan Subdistrict, Liulianghe Subdistrict

Towns:
Longwang, Shiqiao, Huangji, Huopai, Guyi, Zhuji, Chenghe, Shuanggou, Zhangjiaji, Huanglong, Yushan, Dongjin, Mizhuang

Laohekou
Two subdistricts:
Guanghua Subdistrict, Zanyang Subdistrict

Seven towns:
Menglou, Zhulinqiao, Xueji, Zhangji, Xianrendu, Hongshanzui, Lilou

The only township is Yuanchong Township

Other areas:
Shucai Seed Stock Station, Baihuashan Forestry Area, Linmaoshan Forestry Area, Erfangying Seed Stock Station

Yicheng
Two subdistricts:
Yancheng Subdistrict, Nanying Subdistrict

Eight towns:
Zhengji, Xiaohe, Liuhou, Kongwan, Liushui, Banqiao (or Banqiaodian ), Wangji, Leihe

Three other areas:
Yicheng Economic Development Zone, Dayan Industrial Park, Re-education Through Labor camp

Zaoyang
Three subdistricts:
Beicheng Subdistrict, Nancheng Subdistrict, Huancheng Subdistrict

Twelve towns:
Juwan, Qifang, Yangdang, Taiping, Xinshi, Lutou, Liusheng, Xinglong, Wangcheng, Wudian, Xiongji, Pinglin

Other areas:
Zaoyang Economic Zone, Suiyang, Chehe

Baokang County
Ten towns:
Chengguan, Huang, Houping, Longping, Dianya, Maliang, Xiema, Maqiao, Siping, Guoduwan

The only township is Liangyu Township

Gucheng County
Nine towns:
Chengguan, Shihua, Shengkang (/), Miaotan, Wushan, Cihe, Nanhe, Zijin, Lengji

The only township is Zhaowan Township

Other areas:
Xieshan Forestry Area

Nanzhang County
Ten towns:
Chengguan, Wu'an, Jiuji, Limiao, Changping, Xueping, Banqiao, Xunjian, Donggong, and Xiaoyan

One other area:
Qinghe

Xianning

Xian'an District
Subdistricts:
Wenquan Subdistrict, Fushan Subdistrict, Yong'an Subdistrict

Towns:
Tingsiqiao, Xiangyanghu, Guanbuqiao, Heshengqiao, Shuangxiqiao, Maqiao, Guihua, Gaoqiao

The only township is Damu Township

Other Area: Xiangyanghu Dairy Farm

Xianning Advanced Technology Industry Area
Henggouqiao

Chibi City
Three subdistricts:
Puqi Subdistrict, Chimagang Subdistrict, Lushuihu Subdistrict

Ten towns:
Xindian, Zhaoliqiao, Cha'anling, Chebu, Chibi Town (or 周郎嘴回族镇), Liushanhu, Shenshan, Zhonghuopu, Guantangyi, 

The only township is Yujiaqiao Township

Other areas:
()

Chongyang County
Eight towns:
Tiancheng, Shaping, Shicheng, Guihuaquan, Baini, Lukou, Jintang, Qingshan

Four townships:
Xiaoling Township, Tongzhong Township, Gangkou Township, Gaojian Township

One other area:
Chongyang County Industrial Park District

Jiayu County
Towns:
Luxi, Gaotieling, Guanqiao, Yuyue, Xinjie, Dupu, Panjiawan, Paizhouwan

Tongcheng County
Nine towns:
Junshui, Maishi, Tanghu, Guandao, Shadui, Wuli, Shinan, Beigang, Magang

Two townships:
Sizhuang Township, Daping Township

Tongshan County
Eight towns:
Tongyang, Nanlinqiao, Huangshapu, Xiapu, Jiugongshan, Chuangwang, Honggang, Dafan

Four townships:
Dalu Township, Yangfanglin Township, Yanxia Township, Cikou Township

One other area: 
Jiugongshan Tourism District Management Committee

Xiantao

Subdistricts:
Shazui Subdistrict, Ganhe Subdistrict, Longhuashan Subdistrict

Towns:
Zhengchang, Maozui, Louhe, Sanfutan, Huchang, Changtangkou, Xiliuhe, Shahu, Yanglinwei, Pengchang, Zhanggou, Guohe, Miancheng Hui Town, Tonghaikou, Chenchang

Other Areas:
Xiantao Industrial Park, Jiuheyuan, Shahu, Paihu Paihu Scenic Area, Wuhu Fishery, Zhaoxiyuan Forestry Area, Liujiayuan Forestry Area, Chuqinliang Seed Stock Station

Xiaogan

Xiaonan District
Subdistricts:
Shuyuan Subdistrict, Xinhua Subdistrict, Guangchang Subdistrict, Chezhan Subdistrict

Towns:
Xinpu, Xihe, Yangdian, Dougang, Xiaogang, Maochen, Sancha, Zhuzhan

Townships:
Pengxing Township, Wolong Township, Minji Township

Other areas:
Xiaonan Economic Development Area, Zhuhu Management Office, Dongshantou Management Office, Danyang Management Office, Xiaotian Management Office, Huaiyin Management Office

Anlu
Two subdistricts:
Fucheng Subdistrict, Nancheng Subdistrict

Nine towns:
Zhaopeng, Lidian, Xundian, Tangdi, Leigong, Wangyizhen, Yandian, Bofan, Fushui

Four townships:
Chendian Township, Xinzha Township, Muzi Township, Jieguan Township

One other area:
Anlu Economic Development Area

Hanchuan
Two subdistricts:
 Xiannüshan Subdistrict and Diaodong Subdistrict

Fourteen towns:
Makou, Maiwang, Chenghuang, Fenshui, Chenhu, Tian'erhe, Huilong, Xinyan, Tongzhong, Mahe, Liujiage, Xinhe, Miaotou, Yanglingou

Six townships:
Xijiang Township, Wantan Township, Nanhe Township, Ma'an Township, Litan Township, Hanji Township

Five other areas:
Hanchuan Economic and Technological Development Zone, Diaocha Lake Breeding Farm, Huayan Farm, Sanxingyuan Farm, Zhongzhou Farm

Yingcheng
Five subdistricts:
Chengzhong Subdistrict, Chengbei Subdistrict, Silipeng Subdistrict, Dongmafang Subdistrict, Changjiangbu Subdistrict

Ten towns:
Tiandian, Yanghe, Sanhe, Langjun, Huangtan, Tian'e, Yihe, Chenhe, Yangling, Tangchi

Two other areas:
 Yingcheng Economic Area, Nanyuan Farm

Dawu County
Towns:

Towns:
Chengguan, Yangping, Fangfan, Xincheng, Xiadian, Liuji, Hekou, Sigu, Lüwang, Huangzhan, Xuanhuadian, Fengdian, Daxin, Sanli

Townships:
Gaodian Township, Pengdian Township, Dongxin Township

Other areas:
Economic Development District, High-speed Railway New Area

Xiaochang County
Eight towns:
Huayuan, Fengshan, Zhouxiang, Xiaohe, Wangdian, Weidian, Baisha, Zougang

Four townships:
Xiaowu Township, Jidian Township, Huaxi Township, Doushan Township

Three other areas:
Xiaochang County Economic Development Area, Shuangyin Lake Ecology & Culture Tourism & Vacation Area, Shuangfeng Mountain Tourism & Vacation Area

Yunmeng County
Towns:
Chengguan, Yitang, Zengdian, Wupu, Wuluo, Xiaxindian, Daoqiao, Geputan, Hujindian

Townships:
Daodian Township, Shahe Township, Qingminghe Township

Other area:
Yunmeng County Economic Development Area

Yichang

Dianjun District

The only subdistrict is Dianjun Subdistrict

Two towns:
Aijia, Qiaobian

Two townships:
Lianpeng Township, Tucheng Township

Wujiagang District
Four subdistricts:
Dagongqiao Subdistrict, Wanshouqiao Subdistrict, Baotahe Subdistrict, Wujiagang Subdistrict

The only township is Wujia Township

Xiling District
Subdistricts:
Xiling Subdistrict, Xueyuan Subdistrict, Yunji Subdistrict, Xiba Subdistrict, Gezhouba Subdistrict, Yemingzhu Subdistrict, Dongyuan Subdistrict, Nanyuan Subdistrict, Beiyuan Subdistrict

The only township is Yaowan Township

Other area:
Xiakou Scenic Area

Xiaoting District
Three subdistricts:
Gulaobei Subdistrict, Huya Subdistrict, Yunchi Subdistrict

Yiling District
Subdistricts:

Xiaoxita Subdistrict, Yiling Economic Development Zone Subdistrict

Towns:
Zhangcunping, Wuduhe, Fenxiang, Taipingxi, Sandouping, Letianxi, Longquan, Yaqueling, Huanghua

Townships:
Xiabaoping Township, Dengcun Township

Dangyang
Three subdistricts:
Yuyang Subdistrict, Baling Subdistrict, Yuquan Subdistrict

Seven towns:
Lianghe, Herong, Yuxi (/), Miaoqian, Wangdian, Banyue, Caobuhu

Yidu

The only subdistrict is Lucheng Subdistrict

Towns:
Honghuatao, Gaobazhou, Niejiahe, Songmuping, Zhicheng, Yaojiadian, Wuyanquan, Wangjiafan

Townships:
Panjiawan Tujia Ethnic Township

Zhijiang
One subdistrict:
Majiadian Subdistrict

Eight towns:

Changyang Tujia Autonomous County
Eight towns:
Longzhouping, Gaojiayan, Moshi, Duzhenwan, Ziqiu, Yuxiakou, Langping, Hejiaping

Three townships:
Dayan Township, Yazikou Township, Huoshaoping Township

Wufeng Tujia Autonomous County
Five towns:
Wufeng, Changleping, Yuyangguan, Renheping, Wantan

Three townships:
Fujiayan Township, Niuzhuang Township, Caihua Township

Xingshan County
Six towns:
Gufu, Zhaojun, Xiakou, Nanyang, Huangliang, Shuiyuesi

Two townships:
Gaoqiao Township, Zhenzi Township

Yuan'an County
Six towns:
Mingfeng, Hualinsi, Jiuxian, Yangping, Maopingchang, Hehua

The only township is Hekou Township

Zigui County
Eight towns:

Four townships:
Shuitianba Township, Xietan Township, Meijiahe Township, Moping Township

References

 
Hubei
Townships